William Skipwith (died c. 1595) was an English politician.

He was a member (MP) of the Parliament of England for St. Albans in 1571.

References

16th-century births
1595 deaths
English MPs 1571